
Ménard is a French surname. Notable people with the surname include:

 André Ménard, Governor General in the French colonial empire
 Antoine Ménard, dit Lafontaine (1744–1825), building contractor and politician in Lower Canada
 Christian Ménard (born 1946), member of the National Assembly of France
 Claude Ménard (athlete) (1906–1980), French high jump athlete
 Claude Ménard (economist) (born 1944), Canadian economist
 Constance Menard (born 1968), French professional Dressage rider and equestrienne 
 D.L. Menard (1932–2017), Cajun music songwriter and performer
 Dollard Ménard (1913–1997), Canadian general wounded five times in 1942 at Dieppe
 Émile-René Ménard (1862–1930), French landscape and antique painter
 Henry William Menard (1920–1986), American geologist
 Hillary "Minnie" Menard (born 1934), Canadian hockey player
 Howie Menard (born 1942), National Hockey League player
 Jean-Michel Ménard (born 1976), first francophone curler from Quebec to win the Brier (2006)
 Joan M. Menard (born 1935), member of the Massachusetts Senate
 John Menard Jr. (born 1940), American businessman; founder and owner of the Menards chain of home improvement stores
 John Willis Menard (1838–1893), first African-American elected to the United States Congress
 Léon Ménard (1706–1767), French lawyer and historical writer
 Louis-Nicolas Ménard (1822–1901), French discoverer of collodion
 Malika Ménard (born 1987), Miss France 2010
 Marc Menard (born 1980), Canadian actor
 Michel Ménard (born 1961), member of the National Assembly of France
 Michel Branamour Ménard (1805–1856), Canadian-born trader and founder of Galveston, Texas 
 Nellie Star Boy Menard (1910–2001), American quiltmaker 
 Nicolas-Hugues Ménard (1585–1644), Maurist scholar
 Nicole Ménard, Canadian politician
 Paul Menard (born 1980), son of John Jr., NASCAR driver
 Phil Menard (1923–2016), French accordion player active in Louisiana
 Pierre Menard (1766–1844), fur trader and Illinois politician
 Réal Ménard (born 1962), Canadian politician
 René Menard (1605–1661), French Jesuit missionary explorer in North America
 Russell Menard, professor of British colonization in North America
 Serge Ménard, Canadian politician
 Susan Menard, American politician

See also
 Bouillé-Ménard, French commune in the Maine-et-Loire department
 Menard (disambiguation)
 Minard (disambiguation)
 Menards, chain of home improvement stores in the Midwestern United States

French-language surnames